Stratford is a former parliamentary electorate, in Taranaki, New Zealand. It existed from 1908 to 1946, and from 1954 to 1978. It was represented by six Members of Parliament.

Population centres
In the 1907 electoral redistribution, a major change that had to be allowed for was a reduction of the tolerance to ±750 to those electorates where the country quota applied. The North Island had once again a higher population growth than the South Island, and three seats were transferred from south to north. In the resulting boundary distribution, every existing electorate was affected, and three electorates were established for the first time, including the Stratford electorate.

The electorate was mixed urban and rural, with the town of Stratford located near the electorate's southern boundary. In the 1908 election, the rural / urban split for the country quote was a ratio of 4 to 1, and it more or less held this ratio until the country quota was abolished. In the 1918 electoral redistribution, the town of Inglewood was gained from the adjacent  electorate. In the 1927 electoral redistribution, the electorate was not landlocked any longer for the first time, but gained the North Taranaki Bight coastline from just east of Waitara to the Mokau River, and the settlement of Mokau was thus gained.

The Electoral Amendment Act 1945 abolished the country quote, and this was implemented through the 1946 electoral redistribution, which saw a reduction in the number of rural electorates, and an increase in their size. Many electorates were abolished, including Stratford, and its area was subsumed in the enlarged  electorate.

There was no adjustments in the number of electorates between the South and North Islands, but the law changes resulted in boundary adjustments to almost every electorate through the 1952 electoral redistribution; only five electorates were unaltered. Five electorates were reconstituted (including Stratford) and one was newly created, and a corresponding six electorates were abolished; all of these in the North Island.

History
The electorate existed from 1908 to 1946, and from 1954 to 1978. The first representative was the conservative politician John Bird Hine, who defeated Walter Symes of the Liberal Party.

Hine joined the Reform Party when it established itself in 1909. The 1919 election was declared void, but Masters won the resulting .

Members of Parliament
The Stratford electorate was represented by six Members of Parliament:

Key

1Robert Masters was elected in 1919; the election was declared void but Masters was elected in the subsequent

Election results

1943 election

1938 election

1935 election

1931 election

 
 
 
 
 
 

 

Table footnotes:

1928 election

1920 by-election

Notes

References

Historical electorates of New Zealand
Politics of Taranaki
1908 establishments in New Zealand
1946 disestablishments in New Zealand
1978 disestablishments in New Zealand
1954 establishments in New Zealand
Stratford, New Zealand